George Smith Patton IV (December 24, 1923 – June 27, 2004) was a major general in the United States Army and the son of World War II General George S. Patton Jr. He served in the Korean War and the Vietnam War.

Military career
Patton was educated at The Hill School. A 1946 graduate of the United States Military Academy, Patton was initially trained as an infantry officer. His first assignment was to Regensburg, West Germany, where he participated in the 1948 Berlin Airlift. The troops under his command were used to load supplies onto Air Force transport aircraft bound for Berlin. In 1952, he joined C Company, 63rd Tank Battalion, 1st Infantry Division, as a platoon leader. A year after he returned from Germany, he married Joanne Holbrook.

Korean War
Patton served in the Korean War from February 1953, commanding "A" Company of the 140th Tank Battalion, 40th Infantry Division. He received his first Silver Star and the Purple Heart in Korea.

Returning to the United States in 1954, Patton, now a captain, was initially assigned to West Point, but was quickly picked up as part of an exchange program and was sent to teach at the United States Naval Academy.

Vietnam War
Patton served a total of three tours of duty in South Vietnam, the first from April 1962 to April 1963 at Military Assistance Command, Vietnam, during which he was promoted to lieutenant colonel. He then took command of the 2d Battalion, 81st Armor of the 1st Armored Division at Fort Hood Texas, before his second tour in 1967, this one lasting only three months. During Patton's final and most intense tour, lasting from January 1968 to January 1969, he was awarded two Distinguished Service Crosses for his actions on the battlefield. During this final tour, he was initially assigned as Chief of Operations and Plans at Headquarters, United States Army Vietnam. However, after his promotion to colonel in April 1968, he was given command of the 11th Armored Cavalry Regiment. During his three tours in Vietnam, Patton, who frequently used helicopters as a mobile command post, was shot down three times and was awarded the Distinguished Flying Cross.

Post-war
After Vietnam, Patton was promoted to brigadier general in June 1970 before becoming the commanding general of the 2nd Armored Division, in 1975, as a major general. This was a unit his father had commanded just before the United States had entered World War II, making this the first time in United States Army history that a father and a son had both commanded the same division.

Brigadier General Patton was Deputy Post Commander at Fort Knox, Kentucky during 1972. He was also Assistant Commandant of the Armor School at the same time.

Patton was assigned to the VII Corps in Germany, as the Deputy Commander. He was stationed near Stuttgart, where Manfred Rommel, son of Field Marshal Erwin Rommel, was a government official who later became the city's mayor. The sons of the two former adversaries entered a much publicized friendship, which continued until Patton's death in 2004. The two men shared the same birthday, December 24. From 5 August 1975 to 3 November 1977, he commanded the 2nd Armored Division at Fort Hood, Texas.

Awards and decorations
Patton's military awards include:
Badges

Decorations

Unit Award

Service Medals

Foreign Awards

Post-military work and death

In the years after his 1980 retirement, Patton turned an estate owned by his father located north of Boston into the Green Meadows Farm, where he named the fields after soldiers who died under his command in Vietnam.

During the first years after his retirement from the Army, Patton was interviewed by journalist Kim Willenson for his book The Bad War: An Oral History of the Vietnam War, which was published in June 1987. In the 1990s, Patton worked alongside author Brian Sobel to write The Fighting Pattons, a book that serves as an official family biography of his father as well as a comparison between the military of his father's generation and that of his own, a time which covered five conflicts and almost 70 years of combined service. The Fighting Pattons was published in 1997.

He died from a form of Parkinson's disease at the age of 80 in 2004.

Family name
Patton was the fourth in his line to be named George Smith Patton. His great-grandfather, the first George Smith Patton, was a colonel in the Confederate States Army during the American Civil War. Commanding a brigade at the Battle of Opequon, also known as the Third Battle of Winchester on September 19, 1864, he was wounded, captured and died. True to what would be a Patton family characteristic of never admitting defeat, Patton was mortally wounded in a nearly hopeless attempt to rally his men after his brigade had been shot to pieces and all his subordinate regiments' colors had been captured. Patton's grandfather, born George William Patton in 1856, changed his name to George Smith Patton in 1868, in honor of his father. Patton's father was George Smith Patton Jr., the renowned World War II general most famous for his command of the Third U.S. Army in Northwest Europe in 1944 and 1945.

Though given the name Junior, Patton's father was actually the third George Smith Patton. For this reason, Patton was christened George Smith Patton IV. Following his father's death in 1945, Patton changed his legal name to George Smith Patton, dropping the Roman numerals.

His eldest son, technically the fifth George S. Patton, is also known as George Smith Patton Jr., WW-II General Patton's young grandson, who still is living, has given interviews on the History Channel and the Military Channel, recalling his family heritage.

Another son, Robert H. Patton, has written a history of the Patton family: The Pattons: A Personal History of an American Family (Crown, 1994).

His youngest son Benjamin Patton has written a family biography entitled Growing Up Patton: Reflections on Heroes, History, and Family Wisdom, which reflected on his grandfather and father's careers.  Benjamin, a filmmaker, also recorded tapes of his father's memories of his own and his grandfather's experiences, and those tapes formed the basis of the book The Fighting Pattons by Brian M. Sobel.

References

External links

 Arlington National Cemetery
 Webcast presentation by Patton's son, Benjamin, at the Pritzker Military Library on October 18, 2012, regarding his book Growing Up Patton: Reflections on Heroes, History and Family Wisdom

1923 births
2004 deaths
United States Army personnel of the Korean War
United States Army personnel of the Vietnam War
Burials at Arlington National Cemetery
Neurological disease deaths in Massachusetts
Deaths from Parkinson's disease
Recipients of the Distinguished Flying Cross (United States)
Recipients of the Distinguished Service Cross (United States)
Recipients of the Legion of Merit
Recipients of the Silver Star
Recipients of the Distinguished Service Order (Vietnam)
United States Army generals
United States Military Academy alumni
The Hill School alumni
George S. Patton
Writers from Boston
Military personnel from Massachusetts
People from Hamilton, Massachusetts
Patton family
Recipients of the Gallantry Cross (Vietnam)